Karleby is a village in Guldborgsund Municipality in the Danish island Falster.Presently It has less than 200 inhabitants.

References 

Villages in Denmark
Guldborgsund Municipality